Talcot Lake is a lake in the U.S. state of Minnesota.

Talcot Lake was named for Andrew Talcott, a surveyor.

References

Lakes of Minnesota
Lakes of Cottonwood County, Minnesota
Lakes of Murray County, Minnesota